Rodger Marsden (born 17 August 1944) is a former  Australian rules footballer who played with Geelong in the Victorian Football League (VFL).

Notes

External links 

Living people
1944 births
Australian rules footballers from Victoria (Australia)
Geelong Football Club players